The Birth of Plenty: How the Prosperity of the Modern World Was Created is a nonfiction book on world history and economics by American author William J. Bernstein.

Summary
The Birth of Plenty is a history of the world expressed in economic terms. Bernstein argues that in order to prosper, a country must possess four main attributes: property rights, the scientific rationalism, capital markets and an effective means of transportation and communications. After establishing these as the basic requirements for economic success, the book examines the historical progress of a number of countries both with and without these attributes. Bernstein further argues that the four attributes are a necessary precursor to democracy.

Reception
Publishers Weekly described the book as, "authoritative... accessible and thoroughly entertaining". It also received positive reviews in the economic and investment community.

See also
 A Splendid Exchange

References

External links
Official Website
Excerpt of Chapter One
Excerpt at fastcompany.com

Books about economic history
2004 non-fiction books
Wiley (publisher) books